Harold Kite (November 22, 1921October 17, 1965) was a NASCAR Grand National Series driver from East Point, Georgia. In his brief Grand National Series career, Kite competed in nine events to earn one win and two top-ten finishes.

Early life
Kite attended Commercial High School in Atlanta, graduating in 1939. He joined the U.S. Army in June 1942, achieving the rank of first lieutenant the following January. Kite served with the 1st Armored Division and was wounded in January 1944 during the Anzio landings. He continued to serve in the Georgia National Guard while driving for NASCAR, and was a captain commanding the 201st Ordnance Medium Maintenance Company when he won at Daytona Beach.

Career summary
Kite's debut came in 1950. Starting third on the Daytona Beach Road Course, he quickly found his way to the lead. From there, Kite led 38 of the 48 laps, holding off Red Byron by fifty-three seconds for the victory. He recorded two midpack finishes to close out the year: a 38th in the inaugural event at Darlington and a 12th place in a small field at North Wilkesboro Speedway.

Kite's next two races would take place during the 1951 season when he finished a career-high 25th in points. He started 38th in the history-breaking eighty-two car field at the Southern 500, completed most of the laps, and kept in shouting distance of the leaders to finish 6th. Kite did not keep early-season momentum on his side, finishing his other start that year with a last (29th) place showing at Columbia Speedway.

Kite tacked on two more starts a few years later, making his return during the 1955 season. Piston issues very early in the LeHi race held at Memphis-Arkansas Speedway left him 25th, and various woes kept him to 43rd place in the Darlington Southern 500.

Kite made a new approach during his solo 1956 appearance, making his start at the tiny Shelby track located at the Cleveland County Fairgrounds. But even the small field of 17 could not be conquered by Kite, who fell several laps down and finished 11th.

Kite waited until 1965 to return to the sport, competing for the first time at the speedy Charlotte Motor Speedway. It would be a tragic return for the former Army captain: Just one lap into the National 400, Kite was involved in a five-car pileup on the fourth turn. As Kite's vehicle got involved with Rock Harn, Sonny Hutchins, and Frank Warren, he slid down the embankment and was rammed broadside square in the drivers side door by Jimmy Helms. Kite, 43, was pronounced dead on arrival at the infield hospital.

Kite was inducted into the Georgia Racing Hall of Fame in 2011.

Motorsports career results

NASCAR
(key) (Bold – Pole position awarded by qualifying time. Italics – Pole position earned by points standings or practice time. * – Most laps led.)

Grand National Series

References

External links
 

1921 births
1965 deaths
People from East Point, Georgia
Sportspeople from Fulton County, Georgia
Racing drivers from Atlanta
Racing drivers from Georgia (U.S. state)
NASCAR drivers
Racing drivers who died while racing
Filmed deaths in motorsport
Sports deaths in North Carolina
United States Army personnel of World War II